Cheyenne Creek is a stream in the U.S. state of South Dakota.

Cheyenne Creek takes its name after the Cheyenne Indians.

See also
List of rivers of South Dakota

References

Rivers of Oglala Lakota County, South Dakota
Rivers of South Dakota